The list of ship launches in 1693 includes a chronological list of some ships launched in 1693.


References

1693
Ship launches